Silver hypochlorite is an ionic compound of silver and the polyatomic ion hypochlorite. The compound is very unstable and rapidly decomposes.

Synthesis
Bubbling chlorine through an aqueous suspension of silver oxide.
12Cl + 3Ag2O + 3H2O -> 6AgCl + 6HClO
6HClO + 3Ag2O -> 3H2O + 6AgClO

Reaction of hypochlorous acid with silver nitrate produces silver hypochlorite and nitric acid.

HClO + AgNO3 -> AgClO + HNO3

Chemical properties
Silver hypochlorite is very unstable, and its solution will soon disproportionate into silver chlorate and silver chloride:

3AgClO -> AgClO3 + 2AgCl

If the AgClO solution is heated to 60 °C, it will rapidly disproportionate. Adding silver oxide stabilizes the solution.

References

Hypochlorites
Silver compounds